Pavičiči is a small village in the Municipality of Črnomelj in southeastern Slovenia. Until 2007, the area was part of the settlement of Zastava. The village is part of the traditional region of White Carniola and is included in the Southeast Slovenia Statistical Region.

References

External links
Pavičiči at Geopedia

Populated places in the Municipality of Črnomelj
Populated places established in 2007
2007 establishments in Slovenia